Gyaneshwar Patil is an Indian politician and a Member of Parliament from Khandwa parliamentary constituency of Madhya Pradesh state. He successfully contested the 2021 by-poll from Khandwa Lok sabha seat from the Bharatiya Janata Party, after the demise of Nandkumar Singh Chauhan due to complications from COVID-19. He won against the Raj Narayan Singh Purni by 82,140 votes.

Source and wiki page creation requested by Thakur Priyank Singh Burhanpur (Madhya Pradesh)

References

Bharatiya Janata Party politicians from Madhya Pradesh
Lok Sabha members from Madhya Pradesh
People from Khandwa district
India MPs 2019–present
Living people
Year of birth missing (living people)